The term Religion in Macedonia may refer to:

 Religion in Macedonia (region)
 Religion in Ancient Macedonia
 Religion in Macedonia (Greece)
 Religion in North Macedonia
 Religion in Pirin Macedonia (Bulgaria)

See also 
 Christianity in Macedonia (disambiguation)
 Culture of Macedonia (disambiguation)
 Macedonia (disambiguation)
 Macedonian (disambiguation)